Michael Carroll  was an American football coach. He served as the head football coach at St. Benedict's College—now known as Benedictine College—in Atchison, Kansas, serving for one season, in 1942, and compiling a record of 6–2.

Head coaching record

References

Year of birth missing
Year of death missing
Benedictine Ravens football coaches